The Dodge M80 was a concept car created by Dodge. It was first introduced at the 2002 North American International Auto Show. It was designed as a modern interpretation of the old Dodge trucks of the 1930s and 1940s.

Engine and Performance
The M80 has a V6 engine that has regular aspiration and induction. It can accelerate from 0-60 mph (97 km/h) in 8.0 seconds. The M80 uses a five-speed manual transmission.

Design
The M80's design is loosely based on the old pickup trucks of the 1930s and 1940s. The M80's tires are up . It features racks that can hold objects as big as an all-terrain vehicle. The interior is very modern, but does give it a classical feeling with the fact that it is rugged and durable.

References
 Dodge.com
 ConceptCarz.com Info About the M80
 http://www.allpar.com/model/ram/m80.html

M80